Kin Taiei (born July 8, 1970) is a Korean-Japanese light heavyweight karateka, kickboxer and mixed martial artist competing in K-1 and DREAM. He's also a karate instructor and a trainer for professional fighters. His name is sometimes pronounced as "Kim Tae Yong" in Korean.

Before switching to MMA, Kin was a distinguished fighter in the K-1, praised by both Peter Aerts and Ernesto Hoost as the best fighter to come out of Asia.

Biography

Early years
Kin Taiei (金泰泳) was born as the eldest son in Amagasaki city of Hyogo prefecture, Japan on July 8, 1970. As he is the eldest son, he's got a younger brother. Both of his parents worked till late at night, he was sent to Karate dojo for combing the care with a nursery school. He took an interest in football (soccer) at 4th year of elementary school, and dropped out training karate at 6th year. He won the Japanese national championship for junior high schools at the 3rd year. When he was a student of Kobe Korean Senior High school, he tried to start practicing boxing because he had a longing for foreign boxers, but he joined karate team in his school because his parents objected strongly. For this reason, he also joined the karate team of Korea University in Tokyo when he became a university student. During his university life, he participated a full contact karate championship promoted by Sato juku, but he was beaten by Nobuaki Kakuda. Although he lost, he was evaluated highly by Kazuyoshi Ishii, and he was invited to Seidokaikan. Thus, Kin became a student of Seidokaikan in Osaka after graduation of university.

Debut
On January 31, 1993, Kin participated "The 2nd Towa Cup Karate Japan Open Tournament", but he was beaten by Masaaki Satake in the final.

On June 25, he fought against Changpuek Kiatsongrit from Thailand for the vacant title of UKF World Light heavyweight championship at the event of "Sanctuary III", but he lost by decision.

Work as Trainer
During the years 2006 and 2007, he trained Hong-man Choi in his K-1 career. Choi improved very much during the time Kin was in his corner. They worked together for almost two years in which Choi had nine fights. He won six of them and lost three, twice against Jérôme Le Banner and once against Mighty Mo (kickboxer). Among his six wins was a win over K-1 Dominator Semmy Schilt and a Rematch win over Mighty Mo, in which Kin changed Choi's fighting style from orthodox to southpaw to block Mo's devastating overhand right better.

Titles
2009 K-1 World Grand Prix in Seoul finalist
1996 WMTC World Junior middleweight champion
1995 Karate World Cup champion
1995 K-3 Grand Prix runner up
1994 UKF World Light heavyweight champion
1994 Karate Japan Open finalist
1993 Karate World Cup 3rd Place
1993 Karate Japan Open finalist
1992 Karate World Cup finalist (lost to Andy Hug)

Kickboxing record

|-  bgcolor="#CCFFCC"
| 2014-08-10 || Win ||align=left| Niyama Makoto || Accelerator 28 || Japan || TKO  ||  || 
|-  bgcolor="#CCFFCC"
| 2011-12-25 || Win ||align=left| Ryuji Goto || Accelerator 18 || Japan || TKO (Corner stoppage) || 2 || 3:00
|-  bgcolor="#CCFFCC"
| 2011-06-05 || Win ||align=left| Kuniyoshi || Heat 18 || Osaka, Japan || Ext.R Decision (3-0) || 4 || 3:00
|-  bgcolor="#CCFFCC"
| 2009-11-22 || Win ||align=left| Magnum Sakai || RISE 60 || Bunkyo, Tokyo, Japan || Ext.R Decision (3-0) || 4 || 3:00
|-  bgcolor="#CCFFCC"
| 2009-09-26 || Win ||align=left| Cătălin Moroşanu || K-1 World Grand Prix 2009 in Seoul Final 16 || Seoul, Korea || Disqualification || 2 || 3:00
|-  bgcolor="#FFBBBB"
| 2009-08-02 || Loss ||align=left| Singh Jaideep || K-1 World Grand Prix 2009 in Seoul Final || Seoul, Korea || Decision (3-0) || 3 || 3:00
|-
! style=background:white colspan=9 |
|-
|-  bgcolor="#CCFFCC"
| 2009-08-02 || Win ||align=left| Takumi Sato || K-1 World Grand Prix 2009 in Seoul Semi-Final || Seoul, Korea || Decision (2-1) || 3 || 3:00
|-  bgcolor="#CCFFCC"
| 2009-08-02 || Win ||align=left| Sun Wu || K-1 World Grand Prix 2009 in Seoul Quarter-Final || Seoul, Korea || TKO (doctor stoppage)  || 2 || 2:00
|-  bgcolor="#CCFFCC"
| 2007-08-05 || Win ||align=left| Yusuke Fujimoto || K-1 World Grand Prix 2007 in Hong Kong Semi-Final || Hong Kong || TKO (Right high kick) || 2 || 1:59
|-
! style=background:white colspan=9 |
|-
|-  bgcolor="#CCFFCC"
| 2007-08-05 || Win ||align=left| Sentoryu || K-1 World Grand Prix 2007 in Hong Kong Quarter-Final || Seoul, Korea || TKO (Right high kick) || 1 || 1:43
|-  bgcolor="#CCFFCC"
| 2000-07-30 || Win ||align=left| Stan Longinidis || K-1 World Grand Prix 2000 in Nagoya || Nagoya, Aichi, Japan || Decision (2-0) || 3 || 3:00
|-  bgcolor="#CCFFCC"
| 1998-03-14 || Win ||align=left| Taro Minato || Battle of the strongest ||  || ||  || 
|-  bgcolor="#CCFFCC"
| 1997-11-09 || Win ||align=left| Taro Minato || K-1 Grand Prix '97 Final || Tokyo, Japan || Decision (3-0) || 5 || 3:00
|-  bgcolor="#CCFFCC"
| 1997-06-07 || Win ||align=left| Orlando Wiet || K-1 Fight Night '97 || Zurich, Switzerland || Decision (3-0) || 5 || 3:00
|-  bgcolor="#FFBBBB"
| 1997 || Loss ||align=left| Kong Pathapee Sor Sumalee|| Thailand || Thailand || Decision || 5
|-  bgcolor="#CCFFCC"
| 1996-09-01 || Win ||align=left| Wanlop Sor.Sarthaphan || K-1 Revenge '96 || Osaka, Osaka, Japan || Decision (3-0) || 5 || 3:00
|-
! style=background:white colspan=9 |
|-
|-  bgcolor="#FFBBBB"
| 1996-03-30 || Loss ||align=left| Wanlop Sor.Sarthaphan || King's Assumption 50th Anniversary Event || Thailand || Decision (3-0) || 5 || 3:00
|-
! style=background:white colspan=9 |
|-
|-  bgcolor="#CCFFCC"
| 1996-06-02 || Win ||align=left| Azem Maksutaj || K-1 Fight Night II || Zurich, Switzerland || Decision (3-0) || 5 || 3:00
|-  bgcolor="#CCFFCC"
| 1995-12-09 || Win ||align=left| Peter Theijssen || K-1 Hercules || Nagoya, Japan || TKO (Corner stoppage) || 2 || 3:00
|-  bgcolor="#CCFFCC"
| 1995-09-03 || Win ||align=left| Dale Westerman || K-1 Revenge II || Yokohama, Japan || Decision (3-0) || 5 || 3:00
|-  bgcolor="#FFBBBB"
| 1995-07-16 || Loss ||align=left| Ivan Hippolyte || K-3 Grand Prix '95 || Nagoya, Japan || Decision (2-0) || 3 || 3:00
|-  bgcolor="#CCFFCC"
| 1995-07-16 || Win ||align=left| Orlando Wiet || K-3 Grand Prix '95 || Nagoya, Japan || Ext.R Decision (2-0) || 4 || 3:00
|-  bgcolor="#CCFFCC"
| 1995-07-16 || Win ||align=left| Gurkan Ozkan || K-3 Grand Prix '95 || Nagoya, Japan || Decision (3-0) || 3 || 3:00
|-  bgcolor="#CCFFCC"
| 1995-06-10 || Win ||align=left| Iwan Mewis || K-1 Fight Night || Zurich, Switzerland || Decision (3-0) || 5 || 3:00
|-  style="background:#c5d2ea;"
| 1995-03-25 || Draw ||align=left| Bayram Colak || K League ||  || Decision Draw || 5 || 3:00
|-  bgcolor="#CCFFCC"
| 1994-12-10 || Win ||align=left| Eugene Valerio || K-1 Legend || Tokyo, Japan || Decision (3-0) || 5 || 3:00
|-  bgcolor="#CCFFCC"
| 1994-09-18 || Win ||align=left| Orlando Wiet || K-1 Revenge || Tokyo, Japan || KO (Right high kick) || 4 || 0:08
|-  bgcolor="#CCFFCC"
| 1994-03-04 || Win ||align=left| Changpuek Kiatsongrit || K-1 Challenge || Chiyoda, Tokyo, Japan || Decision (3-0) || 5 || 3:00
|-
! style=background:white colspan=9 |
|-
|-  bgcolor="#FFBBBB"
| 1993-12-05 || Loss ||align=left| Paul Briggs || Revenge || Melbourne, Australia || KO (Right knee) || 1 || 2:55
|-  bgcolor="#CCFFCC"
| 1993-11-15 || Win ||align=left| Tommy Rhinehart || K-1 Andy's Glove || Tokyo, Japan || KO (Kick) || 1 || 2:04
|-  bgcolor="#CCFFCC"
| 1993-09-04 || Win ||align=left| Phothai Chorwaikool || K-1 Illusion || Tokyo, Japan || Decision (3-0) || 5 || 3:00
|-  bgcolor="#FFBBBB"
| 1993-06-25 || Loss ||align=left| Changpuek Kiatsongrit || Sanctuary III || Osaka, Osaka, Japan || Decision (3-0) || 5 || 3:00
|-
! style=background:white colspan=9 |
|-  bgcolor="#CCFFCC"
| 1993-04-03 || Win ||align=left| Michael Thompson || K-1 Grand Prix '93 || Tokyo, Japan || Decision (3-0) || 5 || 3:00
|-
|-
| colspan=9 | Legend:

Karate record

|-  bgcolor="#FFBBBB"
| 1993-10-03 || Loss ||align=left| Masaaki Satake || Karate World Cup '93 || Japan ||  ||  || 
|-  bgcolor="#CCFFCC"
| 1993-10-03 || Win ||align=left| Michael Thompson || Karate World Cup '93 || Japan ||  ||  || 
|-  bgcolor="#CCFFCC"
| 1993-10-03 || Win ||align=left| Atsushi Tamaki || Karate World Cup '93 || Japan||  ||  || 
|-
|-
| colspan=9 | Legend:

Mixed martial arts record

|-
| Win
| align=center| 4-3
| Henry Miller
| TKO (corner stoppage)
| Heat - Heat 16
| 
| align=center| 1
| align=center| 4:01
| Osaka, Japan
| 
|-
| Loss
| align=center| 3-3
| Zelg Galesic
| TKO (elbow injury)
| Dream 4: Middleweight Grand Prix 2008 Second Round
| 
| align=center| 1
| align=center| 1:05
| Yokohama, Japan
| 
|-
| Win
| align=center| 3-2
| Ikuhisa Minowa
| Decision (unanimous)
| Dream 2: Middleweight Grand Prix 2008 First Round
| 
| align=center| 2
| align=center| 5:00
| Saitama, Japan
| 
|-
| Loss
| align=center| 2-2
| Zelg Galešić
| TKO (doctor stoppage)
| Hero's 2007 in Korea
| 
| align=center| 1
| align=center| 0:36
| Seoul, South Korea
| 
|-
| Win
| align=center| 2-1
| Kiyoshi Tamura
| Decision (unanimous)
| Hero's 9
| 
| align=center| 2
| align=center| 5:00
| Yokohama, Japan
| 
|-
| Win
| align=center| 1-1
| Tokimitsu Ishizawa
| KO (head kick)
| K-1 Premium Dynamite!! 2006
| 
| align=center| 1
| align=center| 2:48
| Osaka, Japan
| 
|-
| Loss
| align=center| 0-1
| Yoshihiro Akiyama
| Technical Submission (armbar)
| Hero's 6
| 
| align=center| 1
| align=center| 2:01
| Tokyo, Japan
| 
|}

See also 
Seidokaikan
List of K-1 events
List of male kickboxers

External links
Official K-1 website

References

1970 births
Living people
Japanese male karateka
Japanese male kickboxers
Japanese male mixed martial artists
Mixed martial artists utilizing Seidokaikan
Japanese people of South Korean descent
Light heavyweight kickboxers
Middleweight kickboxers
Middleweight mixed martial artists
People from Amagasaki
Zainichi Korean people